Universidad Pedagógica Nacional Francisco Morazán, most commonly known as UPNFM or Lobos (English: Wolves) is a Honduran football club, based In Tegucigalpa, Honduras.

The club currently plays in the Honduran Liga Nacional.

History
The club was founded on August 10, 2010, as a sports club for the university.  By coincidence, that very same year a place opened up in the Liga Nacional de Ascenso.  Until that year, major Honduran teams had fielded affiliates that competed in the Liga de Ascenso.  A reform in the league structure forced the withdrawal of those teams, and allowed UPNFM to move right into the spot.  The club's roster was drawn from students at the university; here too, however, the withdrawal of the affiliated clubs worked in their favor.  UPNFM was an attractive loan partner for reserve players at Olimpia and Motagua because they could pursue a university degree while playing.

On 4 June 2017, the club claimed their first title by winning the Clausura of the 2016–17 Liga Nacional de Ascenso. Seven days later, they defeated Lepaera F.C. to earn promotion to the 2017–18 Honduran Liga Nacional franchise.

UPNFM finished 6th in the Apertura and 8th in the Clausura, finishing comfortably clear of relegation and earning a second season of top flight football.

Achievements
Liga de Ascenso
Winners (1): 2016–17 C
Runners-up (1): 2014–15 A

Performance by year

Other departments
List of international participations by Lobos UPNFM in other areas of football.

Squad
 As of February 2019

Former managers
  Salomón Nazar (2011)
  Donaldo Cáceres (2012)
  Nahúm Espinoza (2012)

References

 
Football clubs in Honduras
Football clubs in Tegucigalpa
University and college association football clubs